Cingilia is a monotypic moth genus in the family Geometridae erected by Francis Walker in 1862. Its only species, Cingilia catenaria, the chain-dotted geometer, chain dot geometer, chainspotted geometer or chain-spotted geometer, was first described by Dru Drury in 1773. It is found in North America from Nova Scotia south to Maryland and west to Kansas and Alberta.

The wingspan is 30–40 mm. The wings are white to pale brown or grayish. The antemedial, postmedial and terminal lines are composed of black dots. Adults are on wing from late August to early October in one generation per year.

The larvae are omnivorous and feed on various herbs, shrubs trees and grasses, including alder, bayberry, birch, blueberry, bog laurel, cranberry, fir, huckleberry, leatherleaf, maple, oak, pine, poplar, sweetfern, sweet gale, tamarack, white cedar and willow. They are pale yellow to greenish yellow with several white spots along the side. Each of these spots is bordered by a black spot before and after. Larvae are found from June to August. The species overwinters as an egg.

References

Moths described in 1773
Ourapterygini
Monotypic moth genera